Hevenor Inlet  is located within the traditional territory of the Gitxaala Nation, extending eastward from Petrel Channel on the northwest side of Pitt Island, British Columbia, Canada.

The inlet is entered between Stark Point and Hevenor Point, and contains Clark and Hevenor islets.

Two Indian Reserves adjoin the inlet, Pitt Island 27 on the north shore near the entrance, and Ketai 28 midway down the south shore.

Hevenor Inlet is surrounded by waterfalls, including the Cascades, a linear series of waterfalls at the head of the inlet.

Image Gallery

References

North Coast of British Columbia
Inlets of British Columbia